State Route 253 (SR 253), also known as the Ukiah–Boonville Road, is a state highway in the U.S. state of California that runs between the Anderson and Ukiah valleys in Mendocino County. It crosses the mountains of the Mendocino Range from State Route 128 near Boonville to U.S. Route 101 near Ukiah.

Route description
The road begins in Boonville at an at-grade intersection with SR 128. The road heads eastward through a forested and mountainous area for approximately fifteen miles before entering the Russian River Basin, where numerous farms exist. The road ends with an interchange with U.S. Route 101 in southern Ukiah.

SR 253 is not part of the National Highway System, a network of highways that are considered essential to the country's economy, defense, and mobility by the Federal Highway Administration.

History
This route, under the name of the Ukiah-Boonville Road, has been in use as a road since at least 1897, when it was the scene of the robbery of a stage coach carrying the payrolls for a coastal lumber mill. However, it was not a state highway until 1963, when it was added to the state highway system. It was given its present number in the 1964 state highway renumbering.

Major intersections

See also

References

External links

Caltrans: Route 253 highway conditions 
California Highways: Route 253
California @ AARoads.com - State Route 253
View South from Route 253 at Boonville 

253
State Route 253
Ukiah, California